A polyhedron is a solid in three dimensions with flat polygonal faces, straight edges and sharp corners or vertices.

Polyhedron may also refer to:

 Polyhedron (magazine), formerly Polyhedron Newszine, a former magazine targeting consumers of role-playing games
 Polyhedron (journal), a scientific journal covering the field of inorganic chemistry

See also
 Polyhedrin, a protein that forms Baculovirus occlusion bodies